Tep Sodachan is a widely acclaimed Cambodian film released in 1968 by Van Chan Pheap Yun. It was directed by Lay Nguon Heng and stars Kong Sam Oeurn, Vichara Dany, and Saksi Sbong. It has become one of the more enduring creations from the nation's pre-communist era and copies are still sold today.

Soundtrack

Cast 
Vichara Dany
Kong Som Eun
Sak Si Sbong
Ou Dom

References 
 

Cambodian drama films
Khmer-language films
1968 films